Physopelta is a genus of bordered plant bugs in the family Largidae. There are about 30 described species in Physopelta, found in Asia and Oceania.

Species
These species belong to the genus Physopelta:

 Physopelta albofasciata (De Geer, 1773) (southeast Asia, Oceania)
 Physopelta analis (Signoret, 1858) (Africa)
 Physopelta australis Blöte, 1933 (Australia)
 Physopelta biguttata Stål, 1870 (Philippines)
 Physopelta cincticollis Stål, 1863 (east and southeast Asia)
 Physopelta confusa Zamal & Chopra, 1990 (India)
 Physopelta dembickyi Stehlík 2013 (Thailand, Vietnam)
 Physopelta dentipes Stehlík 2013 (Africa)
 Physopelta finisterrae Stehlík & Kment, 2012 (Papua New Guinea)
 Physopelta flavofemoralis Stehlík 2013 (Island of Reunion)
 Physopelta gutta (Burmeister, 1834) (gutta bug) (east and southeast Asia, Indonesia)
 Physopelta indra Kirkaldy & Edwards, 1902 (Indomalaya)
 Physopelta kotheae Stehlik & Jindra, 2008 (Indonesia)
 Physopelta lisae Taeuber, 1927 (Philippines)
 Physopelta madecassa Villiers, 1951 (Comoros, Madagascar)
 Physopelta melanopyga Blöte, 1938 (Philippines)
 Physopelta melanoptera Distant, 1904 (Africa)
 Physopelta nigripes Stehlík 2013 (Philippines)
 Physopelta parviceps Blöte, 1931 (Japan, Taiwan)
 Physopelta parvula Stehlík 2013 (Vietnam)
 Physopelta quadriguttata Bergroth, 1894 (Indomalaya, east Asia)
 Physopelta redeii Stehlík 2013 (Thailand)
 Physopelta robusta Stål, 1863 (China, Indomalaya)
 Physopelta roseni Taeuber, 1927 (Philippines)
 Physopelta rufialata Cachan, 1952 (Madagascar)
 Physopelta sita (Kirby, 1891) (Sri Lanka)
 Physopelta slanbuschii (Fabricius, 1787) (Indomalaya, east Asia)
 Physopelta sulawesiensis Stehlík 2013 (Indonesia)
 Physopelta trimaculata Stehlík & Jindra, 2008 (India)
 Physopelta woodlarkiana (Montrouzier, 1855) (Papua New Guinea)

References

Further reading

External links

 

Largidae